Library Connect is a program offered by Elsevier that provides resources and information for librarians in the academic, medical, corporate, and government sectors. The program includes a newsletter, webinars, symposia, and social media channels, and focuses on library best practices, issues, trends, and events. Additionally, it promotes Elsevier's products and services.

Newsletter circulation and content 
Library Connect Newsletter began publishing in 2003. Until late 2013, the free print newsletter was published three times a year. In 2014, it transitioned into a monthly electronic newsletter. There are approximately 20,000 subscribers (mostly librarians) in 140 countries.

The newsletter accepts article proposals on its website and solicits content from librarians and information industry professionals. Its content and infographics are often shared by librarians and information specialists on blogs, news sites, listservs and via social media.

Library Connect events 
Every year, Elsevier partners with libraries in various countries to coordinate Library Connect events, including seminars, webcasts, and symposia. In 2012, there were events in 20 countries. The events usually cover emerging trends and best practices within the library community, e.g., e-books, mobile services, library marketing. Many Library Connect presentations are available online.

In addition, Library Connect sponsors the Digital Libraries Symposium at the American Library Association midwinter meeting each year. Recent topics have included mobile technologies and how they affect academic libraries, the new role and image of academic libraries, and next-gen librarians.

In 2013, it launched a webinar program.

External links 
 Library Connect Homepage

References

Elsevier